Piney River may refer to:

Piney River (Colorado), a tributary of the Colorado River
Piney River (East Tennessee), a tributary of the Tennessee River
Piney River (Middle Tennessee), a tributary of the Duck River
Piney River (Thornton River) in Virginia
Piney River (Tye River) in Virginia
Piney River, Virginia, an unincorporated community

See also
Big Piney River in Missouri
Little Piney River in Virginia